Redruth is a town and civil parish in Cornwall, England. The population of Redruth was 14,018 at the 2011 census. In the same year the population of the Camborne-Redruth urban area, which also includes Carn Brea, Illogan and several satellite villages, stood at 55,400 making it the largest conurbation in Cornwall. Camborne and Redruth together form the largest urban area in Cornwall and before local government reorganisation were an urban district.

Toponymy
The name Redruth derives from its older Cornish name, Rhyd-ruth.  It means Red Ford (literally fordred). The first syllable 'red' means ford. The second 'ruth' means red.

Rhyd is the older form of 'Res', which is a Cornish equivalent to a ford (across a river), a common Celtic word; Old Cornish rid; Welsh rhyd (Old Welsh rit); Old Breton rit or ret, Gaulish ritu-, all from Indo-European *prtus derived word in -tu from the root *per " to cross, to go through "; Proto-Germanic *furdúz (English ford, German Furt); Latin portus, all related to the Celtic word.

Again, it is the -ruth (and not the Red- part of the name) which means the colour red.

Beroul's Roman de Tristan features a location in Cornwall called Crois Rouge in Norman French or 'red cross' in English.

History

Traditionally in the Penwith Hundred, the town has developed away from the original settlement, which was near where the present Churchtown (around St. Euny's Church) district of Redruth stands today. This location is a steeply wooded valley, with Carn Brea on one side and the now-called Bullers Hill on the other. The presence of shallow lodes of tin and copper lying east to west made it an advantageous site for extracting metals, including, tin, lead and copper. The first settlers stayed by a crossing in the river and started extracting metal ores, and this process turned the colour of the river red.

Historically, Redruth was a small market town overshadowed by its neighbours until a boom in the demand for copper ore during the 18th century. Copper ore had mostly been discarded by the Cornish tin-mining industry but was now needed to make brass, an essential metal in the Industrial Revolution. Surrounded by copper ore deposits, Redruth quickly became one of the largest and richest mining areas in Britain and the town's population grew markedly, although most miners' families remained poor.

In the 1880s and 1890s the town end of Clinton Road gained a number of institutions, notably a School of Mines and Art School in 1882–83, St. Andrew's Church (replacing the chapel in Chapel Street) in 1883 and, opposite, the Free Library, built in 1895. The Mining Exchange was built in 1880 as a place for the trading of mineral stock. By the turn of the 20th century, Victoria Park had been laid out to commemorate the Golden Jubilee and this part of town had taken on its present appearance – a far cry from the jumble of mining activity that had taken place there in the early 19th century. Redruth was making its transition from a market town dominated by mines and industry to a residential centre.

By the end of the 19th century, the Cornish mining industry was in decline and Britain was importing most of its copper ore. To find employment, many miners emigrated to the newer mining industries in the Americas, Pachuca, Mexico, Australasia and South Africa. Cornwall's last fully operational mine, South Crofty at Pool between Redruth and Camborne, closed in March 1998.

Governance

Parliamentary representation
The Camborne and Redruth constituency was created for the 2010 general election, following a review of parliamentary representation in Cornwall by the Boundary Commission for England, which increased the number of seats in the county from five to six.
It is primarily a successor to the former Falmouth and Camborne seat.

In the 2019 United Kingdom general election the results were:

Local government
Redruth until the late 1800s comprised the Redruth Urban District and Redruth Rural District. The urban district was merged with that of Camborne and parts of Redruth Rural District and Helston Rural District (both of which were being abolished) in 1934 to form the Camborne-Redruth Urban District. The urban district persisted until it was merged into the Kerrier district of Cornwall under the Local Government Act 1972. Redruth is represented on Cornwall Council by three wards: Redruth Central, Redruth North and Redruth South.

Town Council
The composition of Redruth Town Council as of March 2023:

Education

Redruth School, a Technology College, is a secondary school, for ages 11–16. It used to have a sixth form, for ages 16–18, however it closed applications for new students in 2016 and officially closed in 2020 due to funding cuts.
The town used to have a coeducational independent school, Highfields Private School, but this closed in 2012.

Primary schools within the town include Pennoweth School, Treleigh School, Treloweth Community Primary School, Trewirgie Infant School and Trewirgie Junior School.

The Curnow Community Special School caters for students with special needs.

The Passmore Edwards Free Library was built in 1894. Its architect was James Hicks who used a castellated baronial style; there is a prominent octagonal tower. The reading room was once the school of Thomas Collins, where Collins, who had been headmaster of Trewirgie School, taught local children and the children left behind by parents who had emigrated overseas.

Notable buildings
The Parish Church of St Uny, which is some distance from the town centre, is of Norman foundation but was rebuilt in 1756. The patron saint is also honoured at Lelant. The tower is two centuries earlier and the whole church is built of granite. A chapel of ease was built in the town in 1828 but it is no longer in use. Other places of worship include the Wesleyan Church of 1826, the Free Methodist Church of 1864 (in grand Italianate style) and the Quaker Meeting House of 1833 (no longer in use).

The former post office in Alma Place is now Redruth Library.

The Mining Exchange building was used as a housing advice centre (it was built in 1880 as accommodation for share brokers).

Murdoch House

The house now called Murdoch (or, sometimes Murdock) House in the middle of Cross Street was erected in the 1660s as a chapel and it afterwards became a prison. William Murdoch lived in it from 1782 to 1798. During this time, he worked on local tin and copper mines, erecting engines on behalf of Boulton and Watt.
He fitted the house out with gas lighting from coal gas – this was the first house in the world with this type of lighting.

In the 19th century, the house was used as a tea room, run by a Mrs Knuckey. In 1931 Mr A. Pearce Jenkin, a leading citizen of Redruth purchased the house and gave it as a gift to the Society of Friends (Quakers).

Murdoch House has since been fully restored and is now regularly used by the Redruth Old Cornwall Society, as well as the Cornish-American Connection and the Redruth Story Group. Next door are St. Rumon's Gardens.

Kresen Kernow
Kresen Kernow, on the site of Redruth Brewery, houses the archives and collections of the former Cornwall Records Office and Cornish Studies Library.  It also holds a collection of Tregellas Tapestries which depict the history of Cornwall in embroidery.

Tin Miner Statue

A bronze sculpture of a Cornish miner by artist David Annand standing at 6 feet 7 inches was erected in April 2008.
The sculpture was commissioned by the Redruth Public Realm Working Party's Mining Art Group in response to comments received during the consultation process, that the town did not have anything to represent the history of the men who worked down the tin and copper mines in the area.
David Annand was selected from over 70 artists who responded to an advert placed by Cornwall Arts Centre Trust, the project managers, for expressions of interest in August 2006.

21st century

Redruth is a small commercial town. It is twinned with Plumergat and Meriadec in Brittany, France, Mineral Point, Wisconsin in the United States, and Real del Monte in Mexico. A museum organised by the Old Cornwall Society is housed in the Town Council office at the bottom of the main street.

Redruth is also home to Carn Brea, which has most historical interest. The Carn, however, is not the highest point in Redruth; it is beaten slightly by Carnmenellis, south west of the town centre.

Sport
Redruth Rugby Football Club currently play in National League 2 South (tier 4 of rugby union in England). Players such as Phil Vickery and Rob Thirlby have both passed through its ranks though the club's most famous "son" must be Richard Sharp OBE. A resident of Clinton Road with his mother and brother Nigel, he represented Redruth, Cornwall, and England, leading his country to the Five Nations title in 1963. Redruth football club has not enjoyed as much success but still thrives in its regular fixtures. On the high street there is a Tang Soo Do (Korean Karate) and Kickboxing Academy named ISK Martial Arts. Duchy Hockey Club are based at Pool Academy on the outskirts of Redruth and compete in the West of England regional leagues. Redruth Cricket Club currently consists of 4 Men's playing XIs, one women's XI and multiple youth sides. Redruth First XI play in the Cornwall Cricket League ECB Premier League, coming second in the 2019 season. The Second XI placed second in County League One, the second division of Cornish Cricket, in the same year.

Performing arts
Actress Kristin Scott Thomas, electronic musician Luke Vibert, baritone Benjamin Luxon, opera singer Alan Opie, record producer and broadcaster Tris Penna, and the co founder of and drummer with Fleetwood Mac, Mick Fleetwood, were all born here. The writer and comedian Rory McGrath was born here and educated at the town's secondary school, Cornish artist Jonathan Polkest studied art at The Redruth School of Art in Clinton Road, The musician Aphex Twin (and friend of Vibert) grew up near Redruth. Luke Vibert has released an album called Chicago, Detroit, Redruth and has also recorded under the alias Kerrier District; a reference to name of the district in which Redruth is located. Hedluv + Passman both grew up in Redruth, and wrote the song "'druth" in tribute to the town. The traditional Cornish dance and music group, Hevva is based in Redruth.

Scholars and philanthropists
The historians Kenneth Hamilton Jenkin and Charles Thomas were also born in Redruth, and the Victorian philanthropist John Passmore Edwards was born in the neighbouring village of Blackwater.

Town centre shopping
Key shops and other outlets within the town centre include a multi-screen cinema, a covered market way, an old butter market, various antique shops, a second hand book shop and two supermarkets, plus Greens Newsagents, and the local cash and carry Jims. Off the main street (Fore Street), there are two separate specialist shopping areas, Bond Street (to the south of the railway station) and Green Lane to the north.

Street landscaping
Street landscaping in Redruth includes wooden seating, with granite furniture, signposts, street lights and litter bins, and two sets of bronze 'dogs', which were cast from the boots of former tin miners by sculptor David Kemp. The town has a burgundy colour theme, which is in the Public Realm regeneration work to highlight the town's name. A project to light various public buildings around the town with LED coloured lights has already commenced. Some of the buildings opposite the railway station and the St Rumon's Gardens have now (April 2008) been completed.

Environment awards
On 7 November 2007, Redruth jointly won (with Luton) the annual UK town centre environment awards, which are run by the BCSC (a retail property consortium). The judges praised the cast bronze 'dogs' and also liked the large amount of work that had been done to the town in terms of landscaping the central area (mainly Fore St & the opeways).

Heartlands visitor park
Just outside the town is a European funded visitor attraction, themed on the Robinson Shaft Mine, it offers parking, an adventure play ground for older children and a pleasant restaurant. At times the last working Cornish pumping engine can be seen working. The museum is an Anchor point on the European Route of Industrial Heritage.

Miscellany
It is home to Cornwall's first ILR Radio Station, Pirate FM. On 20 June 2008, the town held its first regular Farmers' Market in Market Place: the Market will now be held every Friday throughout the year.

Transport

Redruth is an important transport hub. The railway station is a railhead for both Helston and the Lizard, and there are frequent buses connecting the three places. Bus services to the town are provided by Go Cornwall Bus, First Kernow, and Hopley's Coaches, all under the Transport for Cornwall scheme. The railway station is served by Great Western Railway (GWR) operated trains from Paddington, South Wales, and the Midlands, as well as a daily CrossCountry service to the North. Redruth is next to the main A30 road and thus has access to the main route out of the county as well as routes to the far West, North Cornwall, South East Cornwall and Plymouth. Another road, the A393, bisects the town in a north–south direction, and links the A30 with the port of Falmouth. A third road, the A3047, links Redruth with Camborne, some four miles to the west.

The Barncoose by-pass connects between the Redruth Community Hospital and the Barncoose Industrial Estate. It is intended to reduce HGV traffic using the main Camborne road and provide a direct access to the Industrial Estate. It did, however, provoke some controversy, as some residents in Barncoose lost their parking spaces to make way for the new road. It was extended further towards Camborne in 2016.

Notable people
 Svetlana Alliluyeva, Daughter of Russian dictator Joseph Stalin
 Peter Bayley (1944–2018), scholar of French literature, born and educated in Redruth.
 Mick Fleetwood (born 1947), drummer and co-founder of the band Fleetwood Mac
 Stephen Frost (born 1955), actor, writer and comedian
 John Gray (1817–), member of the Wisconsin State Assembly
 Harold Hayman (1894–1966), Labour MP
 Hedluv + Passman, inventors of Casio Rap
 Richard D. James (born 1971), musician and DJ, also known as Aphex Twin, attended Redruth School
 Benjamin Luxon (born 1937), baritone and narrator
 Rory McGrath (born 1956), actor, writer and comedian
 David Menhennet (1928–2016), former Librarian of the House of Commons Library
 JG Montgomery, Australian based writer and musician
 Henry Roach (1808–1889), captain of the Burra mine in South Australia from 1847 to 1867.
 Ben Salfield (born 1971), lutenist and lutarist
 D. M. Thomas (born 1935), poet, novelist, translator
 Kristin Scott Thomas (born 1960), actress
 Charles Thomas (1928–2016), historian and archaeologist
 Luke Vibert (born 1973), musician and electronic music producer
E. Florence Whitlock (1889-1978), composer

Twinning
Redruth is twinned with:

 Plumergat et Meriadec, Brittany, France 
 Mineral Point, Wisconsin, United States 
 Real del Monte, Hidalgo, Mexico

In popular culture
Thomas Redruth is a character in R. L. Stevenson's Treasure Island.
Redruth is Elli's hometown in Last Night In Soho.

See also

Carn Brea
Kresen Kernow
Cornwall College
New Redruth, a district of Johannesburg
Pirate FM

References

External links

 
Civil parishes in Cornwall
Cornish Killas
European Route of Industrial Heritage Anchor Points
Towns in Cornwall